S. acaulis may refer to:
 Silene acaulis, a small mountain-dwelling wildflower species
 Stenotus acaulis, a sunflower species